An arsenical keratosis is a growth of keratin on the skin caused by arsenic, which occurs naturally in the earth's crust and is widely distributed in the environment, Arsenical compounds are used in industrial, agricultural, and medicinal substances. Arsenic is also found to be an environmental contaminant in drinking water (well water) and an occupational hazard for miners and glass workers.  Arsenic may also causes other conditions including: Bowen's disease, cardiovascular diseases, developmental abnormalities, neurologic and neurobehavioral disorders, diabetes, hearing loss, hematologic disorders, and various types of cancer. Arsenical keratoses may persist indefinitely, and some may develop into invasive squamous cell carcinoma. Metastatic arsenic squamous cell carcinoma and arsenic-induced malignancies in internal organs such as the bladder, kidney, skin, liver, and colon, may result in death.

Signs and symptoms
Books talk about diffuse ketarosic neoformations in palms and plants, which can evolve into basal cell carcinoma. These neoformations are usually yellowish.

Pathophysiology
Arsenite impairs nucleotide excision repair, and it may also affect gene expression by increasing or decreasing DNA methylation. The high affinity of arsenic for sulfhydryl groups makes keratin-rich cells (e.g., epidermal keratinocytes) a sensitive target for arsenic-induced toxicity. Arsenic has been shown to alter epidermal keratinocyte differentiation processes, induce overexpression of growth factors, and enhance proliferation of human keratinocytes.

Treatment
A chelating agent (e.g., dimercaprol) may be helpful to correct acute arsenic exposure, but it has minimal or no effect for patients who had arsenic exposure a long time ago.
Oral retinoids (e.g., acitretin, etretinate) may be helpful in treating arsenic-induced cutaneous lesions and in reducing the risk of cutaneous and internal malignancy formation, especially in Bowman's disease.
Topical 5-fluorouracil cream or 5% imiquimod cream may be useful in treating arsenical keratoses and Bowen's disease.

References

Epidermal nevi, neoplasms, and cysts
arsenic